1st.One (stylized as First.One) is a Filipino boy band formed and trained by the Seoul-based talent management company FirstOne Entertainment, consisting Ace, Max, Alpha, J, Joker, and Jayson. The group debuted on July 31, 2020 with their single "You Are the One (Ttak Maja Nuh)".

Name 
The name FirstOne was taken from the name of their entertainment, FirstOne's Company in South Korea.

2015–2019 member search 
The group members were trained individually for three years before they debuted and launched as 1st.One. The leader of 1st.One, Ace, was a singer in the Philippines before he turned out to be part of the group. Ace had been part and the representative of the KBS Kpop World Festival in 2015. Under his real name, he released a song "Blow the Night Away", and it was followed by "Ikaw Pa Rin" and "Giliw" through Star Music.

The last member that joined the group was Jayson. He trained for 2 years. Ace, Alpha, Max, and Joker were part of the group "VJBros", a dance cover group that performed at the 28th Philippine-Korea Cultural Exchange Festival on September 28, 2019.

On November 10, 2019, they were the grand winners at Seoul Music Awards Philippines, "Dance To Your Seoul" dance battle.

2020–2021: Debut 
Shortly before their initial debut on July 31, 2020, 1st.One performed at the 29th Seoul Music Awards with several well-known K-pop artists such as Taeyeon, Red Velvet, NCT, Twice, Monsta X, and many others. 1st.One made history by being the first Filipino boy group to perform at the Seoul Music Awards in South Korea. They worked with Korean songwriters and producer for their debut song which is "You Are The One (Ttak Maja Nuh)". Docskim, a producer who worked with Big Hit Entertainment for BTS' songs, helped create their debut song.  Shin Minchu, a composer who is known for his song "Paradise" and was used on a Korean drama series "Boys Over Flower" and a former member of the group, T-Max. And Ryu.D, a choreographer, worked with big groups from South Korea like NCT127, BTS, EXO, StrayKids, and NU'EST.

Debuted on July 31, 2020, with their single “You Are The One (Ttak Maja Nuh)“ reached almost 900,000 views on YouTube.

In 2021, planned to have a project World Tour Concert 'Kpop x Ppop Showcase' along with other K-Pop groups that are managed and handled by FirstOne Entertainment.

On August 31, 2021 the group released their second single for their official comeback. In this single, Gift appeared as the seventh and special member of the group.

2022: Official comeback, PPOPCON, Tugatog 
On the evening of December 31, it was announced that the group would make their official comeback in January 2022, after a year of waiting for their official comeback.

On January 15, they officially released their third single and comeback single "Shout Out", the single was written by 1st.One Ace, composed and arranged by Great Brothers and Ragoon.

On March 31, the group signed a contract with Warner Music Philippines as the distributor of their albums and songs. In a statement, Firstone Entertainment said that it has partnered with Warner Music Philippines to manage the rising P-pop boy group.

On April 10, the group performed at 2022 PPOPCON as the main performer, with special member, Gift as the seventh member of the group at the Araneta City.

On April 12, it was announced that 1st.One will perform in SM Mall of Asia at the 2022 Tugatog Music Festival to be held on July 15, 2022 with idol groups MNL48, Alamat, BINI, BGYO, LITZ, Ppop Generation, Press Hit Play, and VXON as the first batch announced.

On August 26, 1st.One released its road-to-comeback single "Turn Up". The group was all involved in the creative process of the track. Ace, the group leader, wrote the lyrics, and Max, one of the main vocalists, did the lyrics proofing. The other members co-wrote the rap parts.

November 29, the group pop-rock single “Shout Out,” debuted at the 13th spot on the Billboard Hot Trending Song (HTS). Before the day ended, "Shout Out" bested all other songs worldwide as it snatched the coveted number 1 spot on the 24-hour real-time ranking. This triumph makes 1stOne the second Filipino act to enter Billboard’s HTS chart. 1stOne now joins the P-Pop supergroup SB19 on the milestone, the first artist to invade the international music tabulation phenomenally.

Artistry

Influences
The group admires singers such as Michael Jackson, Gary Valenciano, Backstreet Boys, and NSYNC.

Members
Current
 Ace  – leader and main vocalist 
 Max – main vocalist 
 Alpha – main rapper 
 Joker – lead vocalist
 J - lead rapper 
 Jayson - sub-rapper 

Special
 Gift

Discography

Singles

Promotional singles

Filmography

Music videos

Television

Awards and nominations

References 



Filipino boy bands
Filipino pop music groups
Musical groups from Metro Manila
Musical groups established in 2020
2020 establishments in the Philippines
Warner Music Philippines artists
English-language singers from the Philippines